Trident Racing is a motor racing team that competes in single-seater formula racing. It was founded in 2006 in order to compete in the GP2 championship, which was Europe's second highest-ranking single-seater formula below Formula One. Trident is headquartered at San Pietro Mosezzo in the Piedmont region of Italy.

Racing history

GP2 Series

After a rapid formation, Trident secured a place on the 2006 GP2 entry list, represented by former Formula One driver Gianmaria Bruni and rookie Andreas Zuber. It was one of three teams that had lodged requests for the thirteenth entry that was made available for that season onwards. GP2's organiser Bruno Michel commented: "Trident Racing put forward a proposal which promised strong sporting and engineering excellence."

Trident's first year of competition was competitive against more experienced opposition. Bruni provided two race wins, together with three pole positions and two fastest race laps, whilst Zuber secured a single race win. In the teams' championship standings, Trident ended the year in sixth place overall. For the 2007 season, Trident chose F3 Euro Series race winner Kohei Hirate from Japan and World Series by Renault front-runner Pastor Maldonado from Venezuela, who suffered a training injury mid-season and was replaced by Ricardo Risatti and then Sergio Hernández. Before his injury, Maldonado secured pole position and the race victory in the series' single race at Monaco, and secured eleventh place in the drivers' championship despite missing the final eight races of the season. His team-mates struggled, however, dropping Trident to tenth in the teams' championship.

Trident's 2008 drivers were Mike Conway and Ho-Pin Tung. The team's best result again came at Monaco, with Conway leading Tung home for a Trident one-two in the sprint race. Both drivers were unable to replicate this performance elsewhere, but Trident improved to ninth in the teams' championship. For 2009, the team changed its driver line-up to Ricardo Teixeira and Davide Rigon, with Rodolfo González deputising for Rigon for a single round of the championship. The trio scored a mere three points between them, resulting in Trident finishing twelfth and last in the teams' championship. The 2010 season saw a slight improvement as the team improved to eleventh overall; the drivers for the year were Adrian Zaugg and Johnny Cecotto Jr., the latter of whom was replaced first by Edoardo Piscopo and then Federico Leo.

Trident enjoyed something of a renaissance in 2011, with new lead driver Stefano Coletti winning two races en route to eleventh in the drivers' championship, despite suffering a back injury at the penultimate round of the season at Spa-Francorchamps which saw him ruled out of the finale; he was replaced by Monegasque compatriot Stéphane Richelmi. In the other car, the returning González failed to score. For the 2012 season, Richelmi was retained and joined by Julián Leal: the duo scored 31 points between them under the new scoring system, but Trident slipped to tenth in the teams' championship, having finished eighth the season before.

For the 2015 season, Raffaele Marciello, of the  Ferrari Driver Academy, and René Binder joined the team from  Racing Engineering and Arden International respectively. The team finished seventh overall.

The team entered 2016 with Philo Paz Armand and Luca Ghiotto being promoted from GP3. After a winless season the previous year, Ghiotto scored a victory at the sprint race in Malaysia bringing them to eighth in the standings.

GP2 Asia Series
Trident also competed in the GP2 Asia Series from its inception in 2008 to its cancellation in 2011. In the series' inaugural championship, the team fielded Harald Schlegelmilch and Ho-Pin Tung for a total of four points, finishing thirteenth and last in the teams' championship.  For the 2008-09 season, Trident employed an unusually high number of seven drivers to share its two race seats: Giacomo Ricci, Alberto Valerio, Frankie Provenzano, Ricardo Teixeira, Chris van der Drift, Adrián Vallés and Davide Rigon all shared driving duties at some stage, propelling Trident to ninth in the teams' championship between them. In the 2009-10 season, the team reduced is roster two four drivers, with gentleman driver Plamen Kralev buying one seat for the entirety of the championship, and the other shared between Johnny Cecotto Jr., Dani Clos and Adrian Zaugg. This campaign was less successful, as the team slipped back to eleventh in the standings. The truncated 2011 season was Trident's best, as lead driver Stefano Coletti put in a strong showing to finish fourth in the drivers' table, with one win, a position replicated by the team in its own championship. In the other car, Rodolfo González failed to score.

GP3 Series
Trident joined the GP3 Series for its third year of competition in 2012, replacing the departing Barwa Addax team. It became the first GP3 team to intentionally field two drivers instead of the usual three (although several other teams later dropped down to two-car entries for certain rounds), beginning the season with Vicky Piria and Antonio Spavone. For the fourth round of the championship at Silverstone, it expanded briefly to three cars for Giovanni Venturini, but Spavone's ride disappeared thereafter and the team once again returned to a two car set-up. Venturini was the most successful of the Italian trio, finishing on the podium twice and finishing thirteenth in the drivers' championship, in contrast to Piria and Spavone, who did not score. Trident finished ninth and last in the teams' championship.

The team enjoyed an upturn in performance in the following two seasons, with performances from Luca Ghiotto in 2015 and Antonio Fuoco in 2016, allowing them to finish second and third in the respective constructors championships.

In 2018, the team was represented by Giuliano Alesi, Ryan Tveter and Alessio Lorandi. After Lorandi was promoted to Formula 2 prior to the Hungaroring round, David Beckmann was signed as his replacement.

FIA Formula 2 Championship
In 2018 the team was represented by Haas F1 test drivers Arjun Maini, Santino Ferrucci and Alessio Lorandi who switched from GP3 mid season after Ferrucci was banned for two rounds following a collision with teammate Arjun Maini at Silverstone, then had his contract terminated citing sponsorship issues.

For the 2019 season, the team promoted Giuliano Alesi from their defunct GP3 division. On 11 March 2019, Ralph Boschung was confirmed as his teammate. Ryan Tveter replaced Boschung at the Red Bull Ring before being replaced by Dorian Boccolacci, who had previously raced for Campos, for Silverstone. Boschung returned for Hungary before stepping aside to relieve sponsorship issues at Monza for Giuliano Alesi who ran the sole car. Boschung returned for Sochi before being replaced by Christian Lundgaard at Abu Dhabi.

For the 2020 season, the team hired new Williams development driver Roy Nissany who had not raced in 2019 due to a pre-season testing injury. He was joined by 2019 Euroformula Open Champion Marino Sato who raced for Campos Racing from Spa onwards where he failed to score a point.

Nissany's best result came at Spa-Francorchamps, where he finished eighth in the feature race and battled for the race lead with Dan Ticktum in the sprint race, until the pair collided. He scored five points throughout the season, four more than teammate Sato, who finished eighth in the Mugello Sprint Race. The pair finished 19th and 22nd in the standings respectively, leading to Trident finishing last in the teams' championship.

In 2021, F3 graduate Bent Viscaal partnered with Sato, his best finish was 2nd at the second Monza sprint race bringing Trident their best ever result in F2.

In 2022, Trident would take their first win in Formula 2 with Richard Verschoor in the opening race of the season.

FIA Formula 3 Championship

In October 2018, Trident was listed among ten teams to compete in the inaugural FIA Formula 3 Championship. Their drivers were Devlin DeFrancesco, Niko Kari, both of whom switched from MP Motorsport after competing with them in the GP3 Series; the latter moved to Formula 2 midway through the 2018 season, and Pedro Piquet, who raced for them in GP3. Piquet finished 5th on 98 points in the championship with a win at the first race at Spa being the highlight of his season. Devlin DeFrancesco finished in 25th with no points with a 9th place at the Red Bull Ring's Race 2 being the closest he got. Niko Kari finished 12th with 36 points and the highlights of his season were a third-place at Catalunya Race 2 and Sochi Race 1.

For the 2020 season, Trident signed ADAC Formula 4 champion Lirim Zendeli who moved from the Sauber Junior Team by Charouz where he finished 18th in 2019. David Beckmann replaced Devlin DeFrancesco ahead of the latter's move to the 2020 Indy Pro 2000 Championship with Andretti Autosport in late June before a race had been run.

Macau Grand Prix
2019 saw the introduction of the Macau Grand Prix as a non-championship event run to FIA Formula 3 car specifications after the season has ended. The 2019 Macau Grand Prix will be Trident's debut in the race. They are running Olli Caldwell, David Beckmann and Alessio Lorandi meaning they are running a completely changed lineup from the 2019 FIA Formula 3 Championship. The drivers qualified in the middle of the pack with Caldwell qualifying 17th, Beckmann in 19th and Lorandi in 14th. In the qualifying race, Beckmann and Lorandi were able to make it through the Lap 1 incident at Lisboa which got Beckmann 9th and Lorandi 7th with Caldwell being blocked by the incident to finish 23rd. Caldwell retired in the early stages of the Main Race to finish 29th whereas Beckmann retained his starting spot to finish 9th and Lorandi moved up to 5th from 7th.

Current series results

FIA Formula 2 Championship

In detail
(key) (Races in bold indicate pole position) (Races in italics indicate fastest lap)

FIA Formula 3 Championship

* Season still in progress.

In detail
(key) (Races in bold indicate pole position) (Races in italics indicate fastest lap)

* Season still in progress.

Macau Grand Prix

Formula Regional European Championship

In detail
(key) (Races in bold indicate pole position) (Races in italics indicate fastest lap)

Former series results

GP2 Series

In detail 
(key) (Races in bold indicate pole position) (Races in italics indicate fastest lap)

GP2 Asia Series

† Ricci also drive for the David Price Racing team.

International Formula Master

Auto GP

GP3 Series

In detail 
(key) (Races in bold indicate pole position) (Races in italics indicate fastest lap)

Timeline

Notes

References

External links

 
 GP2 official website: Trident Racing profile
 Details of Trident's entry into GP2

Italian auto racing teams
GP2 Series teams
GP3 Series teams
Auto racing teams established in 2006
2006 establishments in Italy
International Formula Masters teams
Auto GP teams
FIA Formula 2 Championship teams
FIA Formula 3 Championship teams
Formula Regional European Championship teams